The Ohio State Buckeyes men's lacrosse team represents The Ohio State University in National Collegiate Athletic Association (NCAA) Division I college lacrosse. The program was created in 1953. Ohio State plays its home games at the OSU Lacrosse Stadium, which has a capacity of 1,800. The Buckeyes have competed in the Big Ten men's lacrosse conference since 2015.

Through 2019, the team has an all–time record of 493-424-5. In 2008, Ohio State won its first NCAA men's lacrosse tournament game, defeating Cornell, 15–7, before falling to Duke, 21–10, in the quarterfinals. In 2013, they recorded their second tournament win, defeating Towson, 16–6. In 2017, they made their first Final Four appearance in school history. They beat Towson in the semifinals, but lost in the championship to Maryland, 9-6.

Season results

The following is a list of Ohio State's season results as an NCAA Division I program:

{| class="wikitable"

|- align="center"

†NCAA canceled 2020 collegiate activities due to the COVID-19 virus.
Ohio State forfeited eight games in 1992 per NCAA sanctions. Their record prior to sanctions was 10–4 (5–2) and T–1st MLA. The pre–sanction coaching record for Brion Salazar is 30–28 (6–7) and Ohio State’s pre–sanction overall record is 506–418–5.

Alumni in the Premier Lacrosse League (8)

References

External links
 

NCAA Division I men's lacrosse teams
Ohio State Buckeyes men's lacrosse
1953 establishments in Ohio
Lacrosse clubs established in 1953